Leinamycin is an 18-membered macrolactam produced by several species of Streptomyces atroolivaceus. This macrolactam has also been shown to exhibit antitumor properties as well as antimicrobial properties against gram-positive and gram-negative bacteria. The presence of a spiro-fused 1,3-dioxo-1,2-dithiolane moiety was a unique structural property at the time of this compound's discovery and it plays an important role in leinamycin's antitumor and antibacterial properties due to its ability to inhibit DNA synthesis.

Biosynthesis
The seminal proposal for the biosynthesis of leinamycin was published in Chemistry & Biochemistry in 2004. This biosynthesis consists of a discrete and modular NRPS, AT-less PKSs, and PKS modules. NRPS-PKS assembly line dictates the loading of D-Ala to initiate biosynthesis, followed by the loading of L-Cys to the peptidyl carrier protein (PCP). The dipeptide is then cyclized and oxidized to form the thiazonyl-S-PCP intermediate. The thiazonyl intermediate is then transferred to the PKS assembly line where the backbone is elongated by six units. The leinamycin hybrid peptide-polyketide carbon backbone intermediate is then cyclized by the thioesterase domain (TE) to yield intermediate 1. Methylmalonyl-CoA then condenses at the beta-keto group of 1, yielding 2. A series of tailoring enzymes converts 2 to 4, presumably through intermediate 3 to complete the biosynthesis of leinamycin.

References

Polyketides